A leader in typography is a series of characters, usually lines of dots or dashes, that are used as a visual aid to connect items on a page that might be separated by considerable horizontal distance. For example, dot leaders are often used in tables of contents to connect section headings with the page numbers on which those sections begin.

Most word processing software includes a feature for the automatic generation of dot leaders.

This word is pronounced  , like the everyday word "leader" (person who leads), unlike the typographical term leading, which refers to the use of the metal lead.

Unicode 

Although manual dot leaders are most often represented as a series of full stop characters, there are at least three Unicode characters dedicated to the representation of dot leaders.  These are U+2024 ONE DOT LEADER (․), U+2025 TWO DOT LEADER (‥), and U+2026 HORIZONTAL ELLIPSIS (…), a three dot leader.

References 

Typography